The flatnose xenocongrid eel, flat-nosed xenocongrid eel, or flat-nosed conger eel, Chilorhinus platyrhynchus, is an eel in the family Chlopsidae. It was described by John Roxborough Norman in 1922, originally under the genus Brachyconger. It is a tropical marine eel which is known from the Pacific Ocean. It typically dwells at depths from 5 to 25 m, and leads a benthic lifestyle. Males can reach a maximum standard length of 17.8 cm.

References

Chlopsidae
Fish described in 1922